Lefkochori is a mountain village and community in the municipal unit of Lagkadia in the municipality of Gortynia, in Arcadia, southern Greece. It is 5 km west of the village Lagkadia. It is considered a traditional settlement.

See also
List of settlements in Arcadia
List of traditional settlements of Greece

References

Populated places in Arcadia, Peloponnese